Jules Bernard Luys (17 August 1828 – 21 August 1897) was a French neurologist who made important contributions to the fields of neuroanatomy and neuropsychiatry.

Born in Paris on 17 August 1828 he became a doctor of medicine in 1857 and conducted extensive research on the anatomy, pathology and functions of the central nervous system. In 1865 he published a treatise entitled Studies on the Structure, Functions and Diseases of the Cerebro-spinal System, this book was accompanied by a hand-drawn three-dimensional atlas of the brain. It was within this book that Luys provided the first description of the structure that is today called the subthalamic nucleus. Luys termed this nucleus the bandelette accessoire des olives supérieures (accessory band of the superior olives) and concluded that it was a centre for the dispersion of cerebellar influence upon the striatum. Luys also traced the projection from the subthalamic nucleus to the globus pallidus and the projection to the subthalamic nucleus from the cerebral cortex. Today these pathways and structures are thought to be central to the pathophysiology of Parkinson's disease, the subthalamic nucleus being one of the major targets for deep brain stimulation.

In recognition of Luys discovery Auguste Forel (1848–1931) gave the subthalamic nucleus the name corpus Luysii (Luys' body), a name still sometimes used today.

In 1873, Luys published the first photographic atlas on the brain and nervous system: Iconographie Photographique des Centres Nerveux. The atlas contained seventy albumen prints of frontal, sagittal, and horizontal sections of the brain. Some of them were enlarged with a microscope, but the majority represented gross neuroanatomy. Despite the popularity of photography as a new visualization tool, the publication of the Iconographie did not lead to a proliferation of neuroanatomical photographic atlases in the subsequent decades. However, Edward Flatau published such an atlas in 1894.

In collaboration with his friend Benjamin Ball, he founded in 1881 the journal L'Encéphale.

References
 Luys, Jules Bernard. Recherches sur le système cérébro-spinal, sa structure, ses fonctions et ses maladies. Paris: Baillière, 1865.
 Luys, J., "The Latest Discoveries in Hypnotism: I", Fortnightly Review, Vol.47, No.282, (June 1890), pp. 896–921; "The Latest Discoveries in Hypnotism: II", No.284, (August 1890), pp. 168–183.
 Parent, André (2002). Jules Bernard Luys: A Singular Figure of 19th Century Neurology. The Canadian Journal of Neurological Sciences 29(3): 282–288.
 De Rijcke, Sarah (2008). Light Tries the Expert Eye: Photography and Objectivity in Nineteenth Century Macroscopic Neuroanatomy. Journal of the History of the Neurosciences 17(3): 349–366.

French neuroscientists
19th-century French physicians
1828 births
1897 deaths